Mönchpfiffel-Nikolausrieth is a municipality on the river Helme in the district Kyffhäuserkreis, in Thuringia, Germany. The municipality was created in 1956 by the merging of the villages Monchpfiffel and Nikolausrieth.

History
In the tithing rolls of Hersfeld Abbey which date from between 881 and 899, Mönchpfiffel is listed as the tithable place Bablide in Friesenfeld.

Nikolausrieth in the area of the Golden Aue (Golden Meadow) was first mentioned in the year 1226 as Novale St. Nicolai in a document from Walkenried. J.M. Schamelius listed in his monastery directory of 1733 a convent as having been founded here in 1236 and as 'ruined' after the Reformation.

Mönchspfiffel is a historical monastery property which was a branch of the Cistercian Walkenried Abbey. From 1920 to 1945 it belonged to the free state Thuringia. After the war and until 1991 it was a Volkseigenes Gut and Landwirtschaftliche Produktionsgenossenschaft, a type of collectivized farm in East Germany. In 1995 it was sold to Raiffeisen-Agil Warengenossenschaft, an agricultural cooperative.

A notable point is that each of the constituent villages were until 2008 in different church provinces of the Evangelical Church. Nikolausrieth belonged to church province of Saxony while Mönchpfiffel belonged to the Thuringian. Since 2009 the two belong to the merged Evangelical Church in Central Germany. The reason for this is that the river Helme was the former border between the Weimar exclave Allstedt and the Prussian province of Saxony.

Population 
As of 31 December unless otherwise noted.

Source: Thüringian State Office of Statistics

Transport 
The nearest train station is in Artern on the Sangerhausen–Erfurt railway. A bus connection to there as well as to Allstedt is run as bus line 515 by the Südharz Transport Company.

References

Municipalities in Thuringia
Kyffhäuserkreis